William de Auco was  Archdeacon of Barnstaple until 1155.

References

Archdeacons of Barnstaple